The Commemorative Medal for the Italo-Turkish War 1911–12 was a medal instituted by Vittorio Emanuele III of Savoy on 21 November 1912 for all civilian personnel and Italian and colonial troops who fought against the Ottoman Empire in the Italo-Turkish War of 1911 to 1912.

Military awards and decorations of Italy